HD 75898 is an 8th magnitude star approximately 255 light years away in the constellation Lynx. The star is 28% more massive, 60% larger, and 3 times as luminous than our local star. It is a metal-rich star, with 186% the solar abundance of iron.  In 2007 the California and Carnegie Planet Search team found one planet orbiting HD 75898.

In 2019 the HD 75898 system was chosen as part of the NameExoWorlds campaign organised by the International Astronomical Union, which assigned each country a star and planet to be named.  HD 75898 was assigned to Croatia.  The winning proposal named the star Stribor, after the god of winds in Slavic mythology, and the planet Veles, after a deity of earth, water and the underworld in Slavic mythology.

Planetary system
The planet HD 75898 b was discovered by the radial velocity method in 2007.  At the time the centre of mass of the system appeared to be accelerating, indicating the presence of a third, more distant, component at least the size of Jupiter. Later additional monitoring however indicated that this long-period signal was likely a result of long-term magnetic activity on the parent star.

See also
 HD 5319
 List of extrasolar planets

References

External links
 

075898
043674
Lynx (constellation)
Planetary systems with one confirmed planet
Durchmusterung objects
F-type main-sequence stars